Joana Valle Costa (born 31 October 1995) is a Portuguese former professional tennis player.

She won two doubles titles on the ITF Circuit in her career. On 27 May 2013, she reached her best singles ranking of world No. 782. On 25 February 2013, she peaked at No. 709 in the doubles rankings.

Valle Costa has a 0–3 record for Portugal in Fed Cup competition.

ITF finals

Singles (0–1)

Doubles (2–0)

Fed Cup participation

Singles

Doubles

References

Note: the following three references show name as Joana Vale Costa (not Valle).
 
 
 

1995 births
Living people
Sportspeople from Lisbon
Portuguese female tennis players
21st-century Portuguese women